John Rogan (1938 – 19 March 2017) was an Irish actor.

His career began in theatre, appearing in productions ranging from Shakespearean plays to musicals and contemporary drama, and he then moved into film and TV work.

He was a cousin of author and music critic Johnny Rogan.

He appeared in the West End in Into the Woods playing the Mysterious Man/Cinderella's Father.

Filmography

References

External links

http://irishpost.co.uk/inspirational-irish-actor-john-rogan-paralysed-london-underground-fall-dies-aged-78/

Actors from County Waterford
1938 births
2017 deaths
Irish male stage actors
Irish male film actors
Irish male television actors